Vandalism is an Australian electro house music group. It comprises DJ Andy Van (formerly of Madison Avenue), vocalist Cassie Van Dorsselaer, and formerly Kam Denny.

Musical career
Vandalism began in 2004 as a partnership between producers Andy Van Dorsselaer & Kam Denny. The duo initially remixed other producers' works before releasing their own original productions. In 2005, Cassie Van joined the group as the lead vocalist.

In April 2009, Kam Denny left Vandalism.

Discography

Singles

Awards and nominations

APRA Awards
The APRA Awards are presented annually from 1982 by the Australasian Performing Right Association (APRA), "honouring composers and songwriters". They commenced in 1982.

! 
|-
| 2013 
| "Coming Alive" – Vandalism & Ikid (Ilan Kidron, Andrew Van Dorsselaer, Cassandra Van Dorsselaer)
| Dance Work of the Year
| 
| 
|-

References

External links
Official website
Vandalism at Discogs

Musical groups established in 2004
Australian house music groups
Musical groups from Melbourne